Galdino Moro Okello (born 1940) is a Ugandan judge. He is a Justice of the Supreme Court of Uganda.

References

Ugandan judges
1940 births
Living people
Justices of the Supreme Court of Uganda
Place of birth missing (living people)
Date of birth missing (living people)